In filmmaking, internal rhythm is created by whatever appears or occurs within the shot of a moving picture. It can change within a scene (film) and from scene to scene. For example, in Citizen Kane the internal rhythm of the scene in which Kane, Leland, Bernstein, and the movers take over the offices of the Inquirer differs from the rhythm of the scene in which Kane demolishes Susan's bedroom or from the scene in which Kane and Susan spend an evening at home at Xanadu.

The scene in the newspaper office starts out slowly and quietly, but the pace is increased until the rhythm of the action is frantic. The demolition of Susan's bedroom begins slowly, becomes hysterical, but slows again when Charles comes across Susan's snow-scene paper-weight. The rhythm of the scene between Kane and Susan at home is heavy and static, yet tense. It is a duration where in the dance is occurring.

Elements used to establish internal rhythm 
 Movement of objects and people a) the tempo of the movement, b) the direction of the movement on the screen, c) the pattern of the movement (balanced, staggered, flowing, chaotic, syncopated, etc.)
 Lenses the effect of a telephoto lens on movement is different from that of a wide-angle lens.
 Lighting
 Camera movement the rhythm and pattern of a camera's movement is, of course, influential. The movement can be slow, jerky, fast, restless, static, prowling, etc.
 Camera distances aloof, distant positioning can minimize the effect of movement or create a point of view from which we can appreciate movement or patterns of movement. Close-ups tend to heighten the impact of movement.
 The solidity, shape, texture, and color fire, smoke, massive arches, masses of people, mountains, deserts, stark red or quiet green objects create different effects. Composition, of course, is vitally important: solid, triangular patterns create a stability that an airy pattern of leaves does not.
 Sound it is debatable whether sound is internal or external rhythm.

References

See also
External rhythm

Film production